Oliver Township is the name of some places in the U.S. state of Pennsylvania:

Oliver Township, Jefferson County, Pennsylvania
Oliver Township, Mifflin County, Pennsylvania
Oliver Township, Perry County, Pennsylvania

Pennsylvania township disambiguation pages